The Extraordinary and Plenipotentiary Ambassador of Peru to the Kingdom of the Netherlands is the official representative of the Republic of Peru to the Kingdom of the Netherlands.

Peru and the Netherlands established relations in 1826. Said relations were raised from Legation to Embassy in 1956.

List of representatives

References

Netherlands
Peru